The BMW N26 is a turbocharged straight-4 petrol engine which was produced for SULEV vehicles from 2012-2016. It was sold in states of the USA with SULEV legislation.

The N26 is based on the BMW N20, with the following changes: metal fuel lines (instead of rubber), a valve in the fuel tank venting system to test the fuel system for leaks, an electronic wastegate and larger catalytic converters.

Models 

Applications:
 2012-2016 F30 328i / 328iX (USA only)
 2012-2016 F22 228i / 228iX (USA only)
 2014-2016 BMW 4 Series F32/F35/F36 428i SULEV (USA models)
 BMW in Canada, used N26 as replacement for N20 for only one year in 2016 as '28i models then replaced by B48 motor in '30i BMW models

See also 
List of BMW engines

References 

N26
Straight-four engines
Gasoline engines by model